Rocky Run may refer to:

 Rocky Run (Brandywine Creek tributary), a stream in New Castle County, Delaware
 Rocky Run (Susquehanna River tributary), a tributary of the Susquehanna River in Luzerne County, Pennsylvania, United States
 Rocky Run (Bull Creek tributary), a tributary of Bull Creek in Butler County, Pennsylvania, United States
 Rocky Run (East Fork Black River tributary), a stream in Wisconsin
 Rocky Run, Wisconsin, an unincorporated community in Portage County, Wisconsin, United States
 Rocky Run, Indiana, an unincorporated community in Parke County, Indiana, United States

See also
 Rocky Run Shelter, backcountry shelters located on the Appalachian Trail near Boonsboro, Maryland